Games 'n' Music
Gaussian network model
Gerakan Nelajan Marhaenis
Germanisches Nationalmuseum
GNM (API)
German New Medicine (Germanische Neue Medizin) a pseudo scientific, anthroposophy based medical sham
Global News Morning, A Canadian television news programme.